Perigracilia exigua is a species of beetle in the family Cerambycidae. It was described by Zayas in 1975.

References

Graciliini
Beetles described in 1975